The Oxford Department of International Development (ODID), or Queen Elizabeth House (QEH), is a department of the University of Oxford in England, and a unit of the University’s Social Sciences Division.  It is the focal point at Oxford for multidisciplinary research and postgraduate teaching on the developing world.

The current Head of Department is Professor Diego Sanchez-Ancochea. Former Heads of Department include Dr Nandini Gooptu, Dr Christopher Adam, Professor Valpy FitzGerald, Professor Barbara Harriss-White, Rosemary Thorp and Professor Frances Stewart.

History 
QEH was founded as a result of a gift of £100,000 given by Sir Ernest Oppenheimer to the University of Oxford. The donation was for the development of colonial studies and the establishment of an associated colonial centre. A further gift of £50,000 was given by the Colonial Development and Welfare Fund of the British government.

QEH was constituted by Royal Charter in 1954 to provide a residential centre which people concerned with the study of Commonwealth affairs could visit to make contacts and exchange ideas.

In the 1980s there was a drive to reshape QEH as a centre for international studies, rather than purely for study concerning the Commonwealth. In 1986 it was merged with the Institute of Commonwealth Studies, Oxford and the Oxford University Institute of Agricultural Economics to create the International Development Centre, a department of the University within the Social Studies Faculty.

From 1958 to 2005 QEH was located at 20-21 St Giles. In 2005, the department moved to the former School of Geography building in Mansfield Road and became known as the Oxford Department of International Development. In 2011 the Palace authorised the use of the name Queen Elizabeth House for the buildings at 3 Mansfield Road.

Teaching 
The Department provides postgraduate research training (DPhil and MPhil) and four MSc taught courses to some 200 students. These programmes involve advanced research methods, personal supervision, subject specialisation and fieldwork. International demand for these programmes is high and entrance standards are exacting. The Department forms part of the ESRC-funded Doctoral Training Centre for the Social Sciences at the University of Oxford.

ODID currently offers the following degree courses:
DPhil in International Development
DPhil in Migration Studies
MPhil in Development Studies
MSc in Economics for Development
MSc in Global Governance and Diplomacy
MSc in Migration Studies
MSc in Refugee and Forced Migration Studies

Research 
The Department hosts some 80 active researchers working on four broad themes: Economic Development and International Institutions; Migration and Refugees in a Global Context; Human Development, Poverty and Children; and Political Change, Conflict and the Environment.

Research at ODID is conducted by individual scholars as well as by five externally funded research groups:
International Growth Centre (IGC)
Oxford Poverty and Human Development Initiative (OPHI)
Refugee Studies Centre (RSC)
Technology and Management Centre for Development (TMCD) Which houses the Sanjaya Lall Programme for Technology and Management for Development (SLPTMD).
Young Lives

Notable people 

 Frances Stewart (economist)
 Barbara Harriss-White
 Sabina Alkire
 Xiaolan Fu
 Alexander Betts (academic)

References

External links 
 QEH website

Educational institutions established in 1954
Departments of the University of Oxford
Development studies
1954 establishments in England